The 1999 Italian Open was a WTA tennis tournament, played on outdoor clay courts.

Players

Seeds

Qualifiers

Lucky losers
  Tatiana Panova

Qualifying draw

First qualifier

Second qualifier

Third qualifier

Fourth qualifier

Fifth qualifier

Sixth qualifier

Seventh qualifier

Eighth qualifier

References
 1999 Italian Open Qualifying Draw

Women's Singles Qualifying
Italian Open